Bergy Bridge Historic District  is a national historic district located near Harleysville in Upper Salford Township, Montgomery County, Pennsylvania. It encompasses four contributing buildings and two contributing structures.  They are the Bergy Stone Arch Bridge (1848), Kratz House and Barn (c. 1861), German garden, Bergy Inn, and Stable Building.

It was added to the National Register of Historic Places in 1973.

References

Historic districts in Montgomery County, Pennsylvania
Historic districts on the National Register of Historic Places in Pennsylvania
National Register of Historic Places in Montgomery County, Pennsylvania